Maryna Uladzimirauna Slutskaya (born 9 July 1991) is a Belarusian judoka. She is the 2017 European gold medalist in the +78 kg division.

In 2021, she competed in the women's +78 kg event at the 2021 Judo World Masters held in Doha, Qatar. In June 2021, she competed in the women's +78 kg event at the 2021 World Judo Championships held in Budapest, Hungary. She competed in the women's +78 kg event at the 2020 Summer Olympics in Tokyo, Japan.

References

External links
 

1991 births
Living people
Belarusian female judoka
Universiade medalists in judo
Universiade bronze medalists for Belarus
Judoka at the 2015 European Games
Judoka at the 2019 European Games
European Games medalists in judo
European Games gold medalists for Belarus
Medalists at the 2013 Summer Universiade
Judoka at the 2020 Summer Olympics
Olympic judoka of Belarus